Ipomoea violacea is a perennial species of Ipomoea that occurs throughout the world with the exception of the European continent. It is most commonly called beach moonflower or sea moonflower as the flowers open at night.

Description
The corolla of the flower of Ipomoea violacea is white, distinguishing this species from Ipomoea tricolor, commonly called Heavenly Blue. It is sometimes mistaken for the cultivar Pearly Gates, the corolla of which is also white, probably because of its
misleading Latin binomial name, Ipomoea violacea, "violacea" meaning purple.

Comparative taxonomies
A comparison of the taxonomy of the two plants shows that they belong to different Subgenera, consequently, Ipomoea violacea should not be used as a synonym for Ipomoea tricolor. In exceptional cases where Ipomoea violacea has to be used as a synonym of Ipomoea tricolor, one must specify the incorrect usage by using the abbreviation 'Auct.' for Auctorum.

Ipomoea violacea:

 Genus: 	Ipomoea
Subgenus: 	Eriospermum
Section:    Erpipomoea

Ipomoea tricolor:

Genus: 	Ipomoea
Subgenus: 	Quamoclit
Section:    Tricolor

LSA presence
The Native Americans of Mexico are known to have long used the seeds of species of Ipomoea for preparing psychedelic infusions; several scientific studies indicate they contain several ergoline alkaloids with effects somewhat similar to, but weaker than, those of LSD It is possible that some of these studies may have mistaken Ipomoea violacea for Ipomoea tricolor, e.g., works published in the scientific journal Phytochemistry and quoted by the Sociedade Brasileira de Farmacognosia, which purportedly showed the presence of Ergine, also known as d-lysergic acid amide (LSA) in Ipomoea violacea.

The discoverer of LSD, Albert Hofmann, himself misleads the reader in his book Plants of the Gods: Their Sacred, Healing, and Hallucinogenic Powers by describing Ipomoea tricolor (the flower shown in the book is clearly one of Ipomoea tricolor, heavenly blue), but is labeled as Ipomoea violacea. As specified in the upper section  of its description, Ipomoea violacea's corolla is white only. Because studies on the presence of LSA in Ipomoea violacea do not specify the complete taxonomy of the plant, it cannot be certain that Ipomoea violacea contains d-lysergic acid amide. As of 2016, only Ipomoea tricolor is proved to contain LSA in its seeds.

References

External links

violacea
Night-blooming plants
Pantropical flora
Plants described in 1753
Taxa named by Carl Linnaeus